Qorqan (also, Qorğan and Korgan) is a village and municipality in the Shabran Rayon of Azerbaijan. It has a population of 575.  The municipality consists of the villages of Qorqan, Bilici Qorqan, and Izmara.

References 

Populated places in Shabran District